Tyreo Tremayne Harrison (born May 15, 1980) is a former American football linebacker in the National Football League. He was drafted by the Philadelphia Eagles in the sixth round of the 2002 NFL Draft. He played college football for the Notre Dame Fighting Irish.

Harrison has also been a member of the Green Bay Packers and Houston Texans.

Harrison later became a graduate student in the College of Business at UTSA, even winning an award for Most Outstanding Graduate Student in the College of Business for the 2012-2013 academic year.

References

1980 births
Living people
People from Sulphur Springs, Texas
Players of American football from Texas
American football linebackers
Notre Dame Fighting Irish football players
Philadelphia Eagles players
African-American players of American football
21st-century African-American sportspeople
20th-century African-American people